Heaven Is a Traffic Jam on the 405 is a 2016 American documentary film directed by Frank Stiefel. Its subject is the artist Mindy Alper. The film earned a nomination for Best Short from the IDA Awards, and won both audience and jury awards at both the Full Frame Film Festival and the Austin Film Festival. It won the Oscar for Best Documentary Short Subject at the 90th Academy Awards.

Overview
Heaven Is a Traffic Jam on the 405 is a film created from more than 20 hours of interviews between the film's subject, Mindy Alper, and director Frank Stiefel. Alper is a visual artist who channels her inner anxiety, depression, trauma and other demons into vivid drawings and papier-mâché sculptures.

The title comes from Alper, who says that one of the only situations in which she feels at home besides art is sitting in bumper-to-bumper traffic.

References

External links
 Official Site
 
 Heaven Is a Traffic Jam on the 405 at Grasshopper Films

2016 films
2016 short documentary films
American short documentary films
Best Documentary Short Subject Academy Award winners
Documentary films about painters
Documentary films about people with disability
2010s English-language films
2010s American films